Ernandes Dias Luz (born 11 November 1987 in São Félix do Araguaia, Mato Grosso), simply known as Ernandes, is a Brazilian footballer who plays for CSA as a defensive midfielder or a left back.

Career
Ernandes played some games for Vitória in 2009 and in 2010 arrived in Ceará, but had passed by the club in 2007. He also spent time on trial in Norway.

Ernandes made his debut in the Campeonato Brasileiro Serie A for Ceará as a substitute against Fluminense Football Club on 9 May 2010. He scored his first goal in Serie A against Guarani Futebol Clube on 22 July 2010.

On 28 June 2011, Atlético Goianiense announced the signing of Ernandes on a season-long loan deal.

In January 2014, Ernandes signed for Moldovan side FC Sheriff Tiraspol.

Career statistics

Club

Honours
Sheriff Tiraspol
Divizia Națională (1): 2013–14
Moldovan Cup (1): 2014–15
Moldovan Super Cup (1): 2015

 América Mineiro
 Campeonato Mineiro: 2016
 Campeonato Brasileiro Série B: 2017

References

External links

1987 births
Living people
Sportspeople from Mato Grosso
Brazilian footballers
Association football defenders
Association football midfielders
Association football utility players
Campeonato Brasileiro Série A players
Campeonato Brasileiro Série B players
Americano Futebol Clube players
Sampaio Corrêa Futebol Clube players
Esporte Clube Vitória players
Ceará Sporting Club players
Atlético Clube Goianiense players
América Futebol Clube (MG) players
Goiás Esporte Clube players
Associação Chapecoense de Futebol players
Mirassol Futebol Clube players
Associação Atlética Ponte Preta players
Centro Sportivo Alagoano players
Moldovan Super Liga players
FC Sheriff Tiraspol players
Brazilian expatriate footballers
Brazilian expatriate sportspeople in Moldova
Expatriate footballers in Moldova